William Collins Engledue (1813 – 30 December 1858), MD (Edinburgh, 1835), MRCS (Edinburgh, 1835), MRCS (London, 1835), LSA (1835) was an English physician, surgeon, apothecary, mesmerist, phrenologist – and, in concert with John Elliotson, M.D., the co-editor of The Zoist.

A former President of the British Phrenological Association, Engledue was ostracized by both his medical colleagues – for his dedication to mesmerism and phrenology – and by the majority of phrenologists – for his rejection of their "socio-religious", spiritual position, in favour of a scientific, materialist, brain-centred position that, in effect, reduced mental operations to physical forces.

Education
Born at Portsea in 1813, the son of John Engledue and Joanna Engledue (née Watson), he was a brilliant student. Sent to the University of Edinburgh by John Porter (1770–1855), (first president of the 'Portsmouth and Portsea Literary and Philosophical Society') to whom he was originally apprenticed, Engledue took his final exams after only two years study. At Edinburgh, he took prizes for proficiency in surgery, pathology and practice of physic, practical anatomy, and physiology; and was also the President of the Royal Medical Society of Edinburgh.

Medical practice
Having spent a year as the anatomical demonstrator for John Lizars, Professor of Surgery to the Royal College of Surgeons of Edinburgh, he returned to Portsmouth in the winter of 1835, and started to practice there.

Greatly concerned with the conditions of the poor – prior to 1849, "he gave daily advice, gratuitously, in his own house [to] the large class of patients who were too poor to pay, and yet above seeking eleemosynary aid" – he spent much of his time trying to improve the purity of the water supply to Portsmouth. He was instrumental in the foundation of the Royal Portsmouth, Portsea, and Gosport Hospital in 1849; and, at the time of his death, he held the appointment of surgeon to the hospital.

Cerebral physiology
A phrenologist, one-time President of the British Phrenological Association, his provocative (20 June 1842) presidential address, dealing with issues of phreno-mesmerism, the controversy of the day, in which he expressed the strong materialist views on phrenology, which were shared by Elliotson – who, incidentally, was the chairman of that particular session – led to Engledue's separation from that association.

Engledue was a strong advocate of mesmerism and, with John Elliotson, co-founded The Zoist; and remained its joint editor until publication ceased in 1856. While Elliotson had (possibly) performed the first medical procedure in the U.K. that had been rendered painless (and had been done without the patient being aware of the intervention) by mesmerism (on Elizabeth Okey in 1837), it is almost certain that Engledue performed the first undocumented surgery that had been rendered painless (and had been done without the patient being aware of the intervention) by mesmerism in August 1842.

Also, in his Cerebral Physiology and Materialism (1842) – the published text of his Presidential Address to the British Phrenological Association – Engledue introduced the concept of "cerebration" to designate the operation of the brain: a term that was later revived, in 1855, by William Benjamin Carpenter's "unconscious cerebration", which Carpenter offered as a more refined development of his earlier concept, the "ideo-motor principle of action" (and which he used to describe Braid's "Hypnotism" in 1852).

In 1858, Engledue delivered a well-received series of twelve lectures on "Human Physiology" on behalf of the three Literary societies of Portsmouth – the Athenæum, the Philosophical Society, and the Watt Institute – to an enthusiastic audience of more than a thousand on consecutive Monday evenings from 11 January 1858 to 28 March 1858:
"…at the request of the three literary Institutions of Portsmouth, [Engledue agreed] to give a course of twelve lectures on Human Physiology … in which he finely expressed the great object of the medical profession, to teach men how to avoid disease, rather than merely to cure it when contracted. The lectures were published in extenso in a Portsmouth paper, and afford evidences of a most comprehensive mind. Elegant and chastened as literary productions, they afford a copiousness of illustration, and a simplicity of explanation, rarely attained by a scientific lecturer".
The series was immediately followed by a single lecture on "Cerebral Physiology" (N.B., rather than "Phrenology") on 14 April 1858.

The Zoist

Engledue and John Elliotson were the co-editors of The Zoist: A Journal of Cerebral Physiology & Mesmerism, and Their Applications to Human Welfare, an influential British journal, devoted to the promotion of the theories and practices (and the collection and dissemination of reports of the applications) of mesmerism and phrenology, and the enterprise of "connecting and harmonizing practical science with little understood laws governing the mental structure of man", that was published quarterly, without a break, for fifteen years: from March 1843 until January 1856.

The Zoist, was printed on high quality paper, and issued quarterly to its subscribers. It was also published for a wider readership in annual volumes. Well-written in crisp, scientific English, it was devoted to the propagation of information about the applications of phrenology (rather than its theories) and to the collection, storage, and dissemination of reports of the therapeutic efficacy of mesmerism (with even less treatment of mesmeric theories than of phrenological theories) – in part, it acted as a disciplinary clearing house for information and the experiences of both amateur and professional practitioners (and their subjects) from all over Great Britain, and its colonies – and it placed great stress on the well-demonstrated usefulness of mesmerism, not only in the alleviation of disease and suffering, but in the provision of pain-free surgery, especially amputations.

Suicide
Enledue "was a man of considerable eminence in the medical profession … and enjoyed a very extensive practice" in Portsmouth. In a state of deep melancholy consequent upon a nosocomial infection, namely erysipelas, acquired whilst hospitalized for surgery on an otherwise unremarkable small tumour, he took his own life in December 1858.

During the coronial inquest into Engledue's death, conducted on Friday 31 December 1858, his personal physician of eight years standing, Robert Pennington Sparrow, MRCS (England), MRCP (Edinburgh), an ex-Naval surgeon, stated that Engledue's nosocomial infection was "erysipelas, followed by abscess"; and that its pain and discomfort were so severe that Engledue "had occasion to take large doses of opium to produce sleep" constantly during April, May and June. By July, he had ceased to need opium and, despite the fact that "he had not thoroughly recovered, and had not the physical strength to encounter what he was called upon to go through", Engledue resumed his medical practice at the beginning of July. He continued to practice up to and until 20 December, when he requested colleagues to take over his work-load.

At that time, given his diarrhoea and nausea, Sparrow had "persuaded him to lay up, telling him that he was killing himself with work", and, as Sparrow remarked to the coroner, whilst "persons labouring under the symptoms such as I have described the deceased to have suffered, are sometimes the victims of an uncontrollable suicidal impulse", he had formed the opinion that "the deceased's mental faculties were very much impaired", that "his mind was giving way, and that he was in a very different condition from what he had been in all his life before", and "was fearful of permanent insanity, rather than of any act of [suicide]". He also remarked that he had, therefore, come to the conclusion, that Engledue "was not in that condition which would induce me to recommend that his mother and sister keep a strict watch over him".

Sparrow made a point of emphasizing that there was nothing extraordinary about Engledue possessing prussic acid, because "bi-carbonate of potash (i.e., potassium bicarbonate) in combination with prussic acid (i.e., hydrogen cyanide) is frequently prescribed as a medicinal agent … in case[s] of nausea in the disease under which the deceased was labouring … and medical men frequently have recourse to it"; and, whilst stressing that he had not prescribed this mixture in Engledue's case, he also remarked that there would have been nothing remarkable about Engledue self-prescribing its administration. Engledue's local dispensing chemist gave evidence that he had supplied Engledue's written request for "specific quantities of solution of taraxacum (i.e., dandelion), tincture of gentium, bicarbonate of potash, together with three drachmes of prussic acid" three days earlier. The jury delivered the following verdict: "That the deceased died from the effects of prussic acid, taken with intent to destroy life, while in a state of unsound mind."

Footnotes

References

 Anon, "Report of the Proceedings of the Phrenological Association at its Fifth Annual Session, at London, in June 1842", The Phrenological Journal and Magazine of Moral Science, Vol.15, No.73, (1842), pp.289-343. (Engledue's address appears at pp.291-318.)
 Anon, "The Late William Collins Engledue, M.D., Surgeon To The Royal Portsmouth, Portsea, And Gosport Hospital", The British Medical Journal, Vol.1, No.108, (29 January 1859), pp.89-90.
 Anon, "Suicide of Dr. Engledue", Hampshire Telegraph and Sussex Chronicle, and General Advertiser for Hants, Sussex, Surrey, Dorset, and Wilts., No.3091, (Saturday 1 January 1859), p. 5, col.A.
 Carpenter, W.B., Principles of Mental Physiology: With their Chief Applications to the Psychology, Pathology, Therapeutics, Hygiene, and Forensic Medicine (Fifth Edition), John Churchill, (London), 1855.
 Clarke, J.F., "A Strange Chapter in the History of Medicine", pp.155-169 in [1874], Clarke, J.F., Autobiographical Recollections of the Medical Profession, J. & A. Churchill, (London,), 1874.
 Cooter, R J., "Phrenology and British Alienists, c.1825-1845, Part I: Converts to a Doctrine", Medical History, Vol. 20, No.1, (January 1976), pp. 1–21. doi=10.1017/S0025727300021761
 Cooter, R J., "Phrenology and British Alienists, c.1825-1845, Part II: Doctrine and Practice", Medical History, Vol.20, No.2, (April 1976), pp. 135–151. doi=10.1017/S0025727300022195
 Cooter, R.J., The Cultural Meaning of Popular Science: Phrenology and the Organization of Consent in Nineteenth-Century Britain, Cambridge University Press, (Cambridge), 1984.
Engledue, W.C., Some Account of Phrenology, its Nature, Principles, and Uses, J. Hackman, (Chichester), 1837.
 Engledue, W.C., "Introductory Address to the Phrenological Association, London; June 20, 1842", The Medical Times, Vol.6, No.146, (2 July 1842), p. 209-214.
 Engledue, W.C., Cerebral Physiology and Materialism, with the Result of the Application of Animal Magnetism to the Cerebral Organs: An Address delivered to the Phrenological Association in London, June 20, 1842, by W. C. Engledue, M.D.; With a Letter from Dr Elliotson, On Mesmeric Phrenology and Materialism, J. Watson, (London), 1843.
 Engledue, W.C., "Cases of Mesmeric Clairvoyance and Sympathy of Feeling", The Zoist, Vol.2, No.6, (July 1844), pp.269-273.
 Engledue, W.C., A Narrative of the Proceedings Relative to the Appointment of the Medical Officers to the Portsmouth, Portsea, and Gosport Hospital (Second Edition), W. Woodward, (Portsea), 1849.
 Engledue, W.C., "On the conduct of the Medical Times, the Critic, and Mr. Robert Hunt", The Zoist, Vol.8, No.29, (April 1850), pp.100-106.
 Engledue, W.C., "What is Mesmerism", The Zoist, Vol.9, No.35, (April 1850), pp.316-331.
 Gauld, A., A History of Hypnotism, Cambridge University Press, (Cambridge), 1992
 Godwin, J., The Theosophical Enlightenment, State University of New York Press, (Albany), 1994.
 Harte, R., Hypnotism and the Doctors, Volume I: Animal Magnetism: Mesmer/De Puysegur, L.N. Fowler & Co., (London), 1902. 
 Harte, R., Hypnotism and the Doctors, Volume II: The Second Commission; Dupotet And Lafontaine; The English School; Braid's Hypnotism; Statuvolism; Pathetism; Electro-Biology, L.N. Fowler & Co., (London), 1903.
 Inglis, B., Natural and Supernatural: A History of the Paranormal (Revised Edition), Prism Press, (Bridport), 1992.
 Kurshan, I., "Mind Reading: Literature in the Discourse of Early Victorian Phrenology and Mesmerism", pp. 17–38 in Willis, M. and Wynne, C. (eds), Victorian Literary Mesmerism, Rodopi, (Amsterdam), 2006.
 Rosen, G., "Mesmerism and Surgery: A Strange Chapter in the History of Anesthesia", Journal of the History of Medicine and Allied Sciences, Vol.1, No.4, (October 1946), pp. 527–550. doi=10.1093/jhmas/1.4.527
 Ruth, J., "'Gross Humbug' or 'The Language of Truth'? The Case of the Zoist", Victorian Periodicals Review, Vol.32, No.4, (Winter 1999), pp. 299–323.
 The Lancet, The British Medical Directory (of Qualified Regular Practitioners of Medicine and Surgery) for England, Scotland, and Wales for 1853, The British Medical Directory Office, (London), 1853.
 The Lancet, The British Medical Directory (of Qualified Regular Practitioners of Medicine and Surgery) for England, Scotland, and Wales for 1854, The British Medical Directory Office, (London), 1854.
 Topham, W. & Ward, W.S., Account of a Case of Successful Amputation of the Thigh, During the Mesmeric State, Without the Knowledge of the Patient. Read to the Royal Medical and Chirurgical Society of London on Tuesday 22nd November, 1842, H. Baillière, (London), 1842.
 University of Edinburgh, List of the Graduates in Medicine in the University of Edinburgh from MDCCV to MDCCCLXVI, Neill & Company, (Edinburgh), 1867.
 Wheeler, J.M., "Engledue (William Collins)", pp.122 in Wheeler, J.M., A Biographical Dictionary of Freethinkers of All Ages and Nations, Progressive Publishing Company, (London), 1889.
 Winter, A., Mesmerized: Powers of Mind in Victorian Britain, The University of Chicago Press, (Chicago), 1998.

External media
 Engledue’s (1835) M.D. graduation record: "Gulielmus C. Engledue, Anglus. What evidence do we have that the External Senses can be transferred to other parts of the body, as is said to occur in Somnambulism?" ("William C. Engledue, England") – University of Edinburgh (1867), p.103.
 Engledue's entry in the first edition of the British Medical Directory (1853) – The Lancet (1853)
 Engledue's entry in the second edition of the British Medical Directory (1854). – The Lancet (1854)
 Doctor W. C. Engledue, Chairman at the Banquet Held in September 1856 to Welcome Home Other Ranks from the Crimea, Proposing the Royal Toast: an 1856 painting by Portsmouth artist and photographer Richard Poate (1811–1878) – in the Collection of the Portsmouth City Museum

1813 births
1858 deaths
British magazine founders
People from Portsmouth in health professions
Alumni of the University of Edinburgh
19th-century English medical doctors
Suicides in England
Animal magnetism
Phrenologists
19th-century British businesspeople
Suicides by poison